Robert Charlwood Richardson Jr. (October 27, 1882 – March 2, 1954) was born in Charleston, South Carolina, on October 27, 1882, and was admitted as a cadet at the United States Military Academy on June 19, 1900. His military career spanned the first half of the 20th century. He was a veteran of the 1904 Philippine insurrection, World War I, and World War II. He commanded the U.S. Army, Pacific (Hawaiian Department) during the height of World War II in 1943 until his retirement in 1946. During that time he was also the military governor of Hawaii (which was at that time still a US Territory) and Commanding General of U.S. Army Forces in the Pacific Ocean Areas.

Commissioned from the United States Military Academy in 1904, Richardson also attended the University of Grenoble, France, as well as the Army War College. During World War I he was a liaison officer in the American Expeditionary Force. Afterward he was a military attaché with the U.S. Embassy in Rome. He was the author of " West Point-An Intimate Picture of the National Military Academy".

Prior to World War II, Richardson commanded the 1st Cavalry Division from 1940-1941. He then directed the War Department Bureau of Public Relations before becoming Commanding General of the VII Corps in Alabama, moving it to set up the defense of California immediately following the bombing of Pearl Harbor.  In 1943 he was made Commanding General of the Hawaiian Department, Military Governor of Hawaii, and all Army personnel in the Pacific Ocean and Mid-Pacific Areas. As Commander of all Pacific Army personnel, he had administrative or what is called UCMJ authority of all Army units, while tactical or what is called today operational Joint control fell to Fleet Admiral Chester W. Nimitz.  He was responsible for all Army disciplinary, training, and tactical unit preparations.  He was the first senior Army general officer to ever serve as Joint forces subordinate commander under a non-Army flag officer, Fleet Admiral Nimitz.

Early career
Upon graduation from the United States Military Academy (West Point), then 2nd Lt Richardson of the U.S. Cavalry was ordered to the Philippine Islands to join the 14th Cavalry. He served in the field against the hostile Moros tribesmen, at Jolo during the Philippine War guerrilla insurrection. He was wounded in action at Cotta Usap, on January 7, 1905, and subsequently awarded the Purple Heart and the Silver Star award for gallantry in action against hostile Moros tribesmen. He subsequently participated in various other engagements against the insurgents until he left his regiment on October 21, 1905. Returning to the United States, he was with the 14th Cavalry at the Presidio of San Francisco, California for the 1906 earthquake where led his cavalry troop from the Presidio as part of the Government’s response to the earthquake and subsequent firestorm.

On October 25, 1906, he returned to West Point as an Assistant Instructor of Modern Languages until August 13, 1911.  Then 1st Lt Richardson returned to San Francisco, California until October 4, 1911, when he sailed for his second Philippines tour with the 14th Cavalry at Camp Stotsenburg. On March 4, 1912, he returned to the United States to join the 23d Infantry at Texas City and Fort Clark, Texas. In August 1914 he returned for his second tour at West Point as Assistant Professor of English until June 1917.

World War One and post-Great War Europe
In June 1917, then Captain Richardson was assigned to the 2nd Cavalry at Fort Ethan Allen, Vermont and on July 9, 1917, he was appointed Aide to Major General T. H. Barry who commanded the Central Department, Chicago, Illinois. He helped in the rapid buildup and training of the American Expeditionary Force (AEF) that was preparing to go to France.  Then (temporary) Major Richardson sailed with General Barry to France from New York December 1, 1917.  Fluent in French, Richardson served as Aide and observer with foreign armies until January 9, 1918.  On June 14, 1918, he was assigned to the Operations Division, General Staff, AEF as Liaison Officer for G.H.Q Allied Headquarters and with American Armies, Corps, and Divisions during the combat operations of 1918. He escorted Allied missions in St. Mihiel Offensive. By now a temporary Lt Colonel, Richardson was Liaison Officer with Headquarters, 1st Army for the opening of Meuse-Argonne Offensive and the Operations Officer Representative at Advance G.H.Q.  With the end of hostilities, now a temporary colonel, Richardson joined the Reparations Board, Peace Commission, Paris from January 28 to February 28, 1919.  As part of the Army occupation forces Colonel Richardson served on temporary duty at Headquarters, Third Army in Coblenz, Germany, and was attached to Headquarters, 10th French Army, Mayence, Germany until June 1, 1919.

Interwar Period

Richardson returned to the United States on July 6, 1919, to join the Morale Division, War Plans Division, War Department General Staff, Washington, D.C.  In March 1920, Richardson returned to his permanent regular grade of Captain. On August 9, 1920 Captain Richardson joined the Office of the Chief of Cavalry until January 28, 1921, when he returned for his third Philippine tour of duty.

In the Philippines, soon to be Major Richardson served as Assistant to the Assistant Chief of Staff for Operations, Headquarters, Philippine Department, Manila until April 6, 1923, when he returned to the United States to attend the Command and General Staff School at Fort Leavenworth, Kansas. Upon graduation in June 1924, Major Richardson sailed for France to attend the Ecole Superieure de Guerre, Paris, and upon graduation on September 2, 1926, he was ordered to Rome, Italy to serve as Military Attaché.  In March 1928, newly promoted Lt. Colonel Richardson returned to the United States to join the 13th Cavalry at Fort Riley, Kansas.

On August 20, 1928, he was again assigned to West Point as Commanding Officer, Provisional Battalion and Executive Officer until March 2, 1929, when he became Commandant of Cadets and Head of Department of Tactics. On June 30, 1933, he attended the Army War College, Washington, D.C., and upon graduation he served in the Military Intelligence Division, War Department General Staff until December 7, 1935. Soon to be promoted to Colonel, he was given command of 5th Cavalry at Fort Clark, Texas. In June 1938, Colonel Richardson assumed command of the 2nd Cavalry Brigade at Fort Bliss, Texas. On October 10, 1940, he assumed command of the 1st Cavalry Division, Fort Bliss, Texas. On February 11, 1941, he became the Director of Public Relations, Washington, D.C.

World War II
At the start of World War II and the Pearl Harbor bombing, then Major General Richardson commanded Seventh Corps Area where he oversaw the buildup of US California defenses following the Pearl Harbor bombing.  Several months after Pearl Harbor, General Marshall sent him out on a personal reconnaissance of the whole Pacific theater to assess the extent of the allied situation. While in Australia, General MacArthur, his USMA classmate, requested of General Marshall that Gen Richardson return to command the Army corps being stood up in Australia. Upon his return to Washington, Gen Richardson frankly reported to Gen Marshall the inappropriateness of US forces being placed under the command of foreign officers. This was based on his World War I experience from Gen Pershing insisting that US forces fight under US command.  This led to the unconfirmed rumor that his report cost him the corps command under Gen MacArthur.

In June 1943 he was promoted to lieutenant general and assigned as Commanding General of the Hawaiian Department, Military Governor of Hawaii, and all Army personnel in the Pacific Ocean Areas and Mid-Pacific. By mid-1944 he had become commander of U.S. Army Forces, Central Pacific Area. As the administrative commander he oversaw all the Army’s planning, logistical preparation, training, and force deployment efforts as part of the overall U.S. Joint forces island hopping campaign that led to surrender of Japan. His Army ground and air forces fought in all the major central and mid-Pacific battle under the operational command of Admiral Nimitz. Lt Gen Richardson stood in the front row of senior leaders who witnessed Japan’s formal surrender on the deck of the USS Missouri.

During his Hawaiian command, General Richardson built up an extensive training operation on the Hawaiian Islands to training all military personnel in amphibious operations, jungle fighting, and other command and support operation.  He oversaw the construction of Fort Shafter's headquarters buildings in a scant 49 days. The "Pineapple Pentagon," has remained the planning and operational support centers for soldiers of the U.S. Army, Pacific since 1944 and was memorialized for General Richardson after his death.

General Walter Short, in collaboration with the Territorial Governor of Hawaii proclaimed martial law in Hawaii on 7 December 1941. The Army commanders who succeeded Short maintained martial law, along with suspending the right of habeas corpus, and in late 1943 a test case challenging this suspension was brought to court. Federal Judge Delbert Metzger ordered the Military Governor to allow two German Americans then being held in military custody to appear in court, and when Richardson refused to comply, Metzger charged him with contempt and issued a $5,000 fine. He was later pardoned by President Roosevelt.

During this period another controversy arose. In June 1944 General Richardson disputed Marine General Holland Smith's removal of Army General Ralph C. Smith from command of the Army 27th Division during the Saipan campaign. General Richardson, as the administrative commander of all Pacific Army personnel, questioned whether Marine General Smith, as the operational commander, had the authority to relieve Army General Smith and whether the relief was justified by the facts.  This minor inter-service controversy was fanned by the media into controversy over Pacific war strategy and led to a bitter inter-service relationship in the Pacific Theater. At the core, this was a difference of opinion between U.S. Navy/USMC and U.S. Army over command authority, pre-campaign planning, and operational tactics. Also fueling this was Gen Holland Smith's low opinion and poor treatment of the Army personnel under his control.

He retired in October 1946, having reached the mandatory retirement age of 64.

Retirement
General Richarson died on March 2, 1954, while on vacation in Italy.  He was posthumously promoted to full general on July 19, 1954, by special act of U.S. Congress, Public Law 83-508.

Orders, decorations and medals

Dates of Rank

References

February 20, 1941 Official War Department Biography, Major General Robert C. Richardson Jr.

External links
Generals of World War II

1882 births
1954 deaths
United States military attachés
United States Army Cavalry Branch personnel
United States Army personnel of World War I
United States Army generals of World War II
Burials at West Point Cemetery
Commandants of the Corps of Cadets of the United States Military Academy
Military personnel from Charleston, South Carolina
United States Army generals
United States Military Academy alumni
United States Army War College alumni

Recipients of the Distinguished Service Medal (US Army)
Recipients of the Legion of Merit
Recipients of the Silver Star

Officiers of the Légion d'honneur
Officers of the Order of Saints Maurice and Lazarus
Recipients of the Croix de Guerre (France)
Recipients of the Navy Distinguished Service Medal